Budapesti Sport Club was a Hungarian football club from the town of Budapest. Budapesti SC was one of the founding clubs of the Hungarian League in 1901.

History
Budapesti SC debuted in the 1901 season of the Hungarian League and finished fifth.

References

External links
 Profile

Defunct football clubs in Hungary
1900 establishments in Hungary
Association football clubs established in 1901
Association football clubs disestablished in 1905
Football clubs in Budapest